Sanky Panky is a 2007 Dominican Republic comedy film directed by José Enrique "Pinky" Pintor.

The film was produced entirely in the Dominican Republic and highlighted issues about the Dominican diaspora. The film was shown at the 24th Chicago Latino Film Festival in 2008.

Plot

Sanky Panky tells the story of Genaro (Fausto Mata), a not particularly handsome Dominican mulatto. He works at a colmado—a combination store and bar—in the poor neighborhood of El Capotillo in Santo Domingo. The opening scene focuses on Genaro, who is trying with great difficulty to learn English. He prepares to make his great dream of going to the United States with an old gringa come true.

The features of such women are later defined by his friend Carlitos as "loose, cellulite, boobs, navel, boobs, white as milk." Genaro manages to find a job at a family resort thanks to his friendship with the Italian manager Giuseppe (Massimo Borghetti).

The fact that he has to dress up as a chicken to entertain the children does not prevent him from trying his luck with women. Surprisingly, he manages to charm Martha (Zdenka Kalina), a young American who, to forget her boyfriend, spends a week in the Dominican Republic with her two aunts, Helen (Patricia Banks) and Dorothy (Nuryn Sanlley).

To win over Martha, Genaro enlists the help of his two friends, Chelo (Tony Pascual) and Carlitos (Aquiles Correa), who in the meantime have turned the grocery store into an open nightclub, despite the fact that Genaro has prohibited them from music is heard. played. during his absence. Chelo and Carlitos entertain the aunts, whose sexual fantasies they try to satisfy, while Genaro seduces Martha. In the end, Martha's boyfriend, Alex (Miguel López), arrives, and after some complications, Martha leaves, while Carlitos and Chelo accompany the gringas to the United States and Genaro stays with La Joven (Alina Vargas), a Dominican that he too has been living in the spa and with whom Genaro has shared his problems.

Cast
Fausto Mata - Genaro
Tony Pascual - Chelo
Aquiles Correa - Carlitos
Nuryn Sanlley - Dorothy
Patricia Banks - Helen
Zdenka Kalina - Martha
Massimo Borghetti - Giuseppe
Miguel López - Alex, (Martha's boyfriend)
Olga Bucarelli - Genaro's mother
Alina Vargas - La Morena
Sugeiris - La Chacha
El Jeffrey - Miguelito
Joryi Castillo - himself
Henry - himself
Yajhaira Quezada - Chelo's girlfriend

Critical Reception

Sanky Panky was a success in the island's cinemas, with attendance figures over 800,000. It was shown in Cuba, Spain, Puerto Rico, and the United States (Boston, Chicago and New York) among other countries, and it was subtitled in several languages. The YouTube version has been watched more than three million times. However, its success with the public contrasts with its rather negative critical reception. The film's cinematographic value has been questioned, with some calling it cinematographed television or even advertising for the Barceló chain's Bavaro Beach Resort, where much of the film was shot. Critics have even described it as a series of music videos, or classified it as a musical or a failed comedy. In its entirety, the synopsis seems to suggest that Sanky Panky hinges upon a series of very clear dichotomies, whether of a linguistic (English-Spanish), sexual (male-female), racial (white-nonwhite), geopolitical (North-South), identity (national-transnational/global), or socioeconomic (exploiter tourists-exploited Dominicans) nature.

References

External links

2007 films
2000s musical comedy films
Dominican Republic comedy films
2000s Spanish-language films
Films shot in the Dominican Republic
Films about prostitution
Works about prostitution in the Dominican Republic
2007 comedy films
2000s English-language films